Daniel J. Cosgrove (born 1952) is an American biologist and author, currently the Eberly Family Chair of Biology at the Eberly College of Science, Pennsylvania State University. As an author and scientist, he is widely cited by his peers and also held in libraries worldwide.

References

1952 births
Living people
Pennsylvania State University faculty
American science writers
21st-century American biologists
Members of the United States National Academy of Sciences